Syllepte nasonalis is a moth in the family Crambidae. It was described by George Hampson in 1898. It is endemic to South Africa.

The forewings are yellowish brown with a dark-edged hyaline (glass-like) spot in the cell, conjoined to one below. There is a quadrate spot in the end of the cell and a dark postmedial line running out to an angle on vein 5, then retracted to below the angle of the cell, with a series of hyaline spots on its outer edge. The outer area is fuscous brown. The hindwings are fuscous brown with a dark antemedial line, angled on vein 5 and with an irregular hyaline band beyond it. Both wings have a dark marginal line.

References

Endemic moths of South Africa
Moths described in 1898
Moths of Africa
nasonalis
Taxa named by George Hampson